Austronilea is a genus of flies in the family Tachinidae.

Species
Austronilea livida Crosskey, 1967

Distribution
Australia

References

Diptera of Australasia
Exoristinae
Tachinidae genera
Monotypic Brachycera genera
Taxa named by Roger Ward Crosskey